Buckow (bei Beeskow) station is a railway station in the Buckow district in the municipality of Rietz-Neuendorf, located in the Oder-Spree district in Brandenburg, Germany.

References

Railway stations in Brandenburg
Buildings and structures in Oder-Spree